Randall Burnell 'Barry' Watkins (30 November 1921 – 20 June 2004) was an association footballer, who played in The Football League for Bristol Rovers after the Second World War.

Having been born in Bedlinog, South Wales, Watkins played local football for Merthyr and Bedlinog before joining Wolverhampton Wanderers as an amateur wartime player in 1939. Towards the end of the conflict he joined Bristol Rovers, also as an amateur, before becoming a part-time professional with the club in October 1945. He went on to make 116 League appearances for The Pirates and scored seven goals, playing as both an inside forward and a full back during this spell, before finally retiring from football in 1957, aged 35.

He remained a part-time pro throughout his football career, combining this with a job in the engines division of the Bristol Aeroplane Company in Patchway. He died in June 2004.

References

Sources

1921 births
2004 deaths
People from Bedlinog
Sportspeople from Merthyr Tydfil County Borough
Welsh footballers
Association football forwards
Association football defenders
English Football League players
Wolverhampton Wanderers F.C. wartime guest players
Bristol Rovers F.C. players